is an original anime television series by ANIMA&CO. that aired from October 6 to December 29, 2019.

Characters

Nine years ago, he survived a terrorist attack on an airport because a detective delayed the terrorists and let him escape. He wished to be like him and so became a detective. He seems to have some type of magical ability that he acquired at the airport bombing that he is not fully aware of yet.

A withdrawn human member of the team, he is a master at making suspects talk by using his innate ability to see all the possibilities and conclude which is the most probable. His marksman skills are bizarre. If he is taking his time and aims at his target, he misses every time, but if he closes his eyes or just fires randomly, he can make impossible shots.

A highly-intelligent elf with a large network of connections. He lost his older brother in the same terrorist attack that Seiji Nanatsuki was injured in. That detective was the one that saved Seiji. 

A vampire and master swordswoman. She shares an apartment with a male and their dog.

She is a homonculus girl with blonde hair who used drones to deliver explosives and blow up Rainbow Bridge to stop an armored car.

Sometimes called Gramps, he is a dwarf who wears an eyepatch over his left eye but remains a master sniper. His ex-wife is an elf. He lives with his adult daughter.

In charge of Special Unit 7 he directs and watches over the team from base, but is shown to be quite quirky, especially the way he wears bow ties. He has a familiar that is a small white dragon with which he shares a psychic connection. He is able to communicate with his team, sees what it sees, and feels what it feels. He is a magic user that can cast spells through this familiar. 

The leader of nine. He is a magic user.

Production and release
The original anime television series was announced on March 20, 2019. The series is directed by Harume Kosaka and written by Yuichiro Higashide, with Takayuki Kuriyama serving as chief director, and Hiroya Iijima adapting the original character designs by Nanae Chrono. Ryō Takahashi is composing the series' music. ANIMA&CO. will animate the series. It aired from October 6 to December 29, 2019, on AT-X, Tokyo MX, SUN, TVA, and BS Fuji. Oldcodex performed the series' opening theme song "Take On Fever", while SCREEN mode performed the series' ending theme song "One Wish". Funimation has licensed the series for a simuldub.

Reception
Anime News Network had three editors review the first episode of the anime: Theron Martin was intrigued by the "action-oriented focus" the show would take with its supernatural mystery story but found it "fairly standard" with its beginning and cast of characters, concluding that: "Though the production tries to spruce things up with a jazzy musical score, this series doesn't do enough in its visuals, character design, or storytelling to distinguish itself yet. It's not bad, but based on first episode comparison alone, I can't see this one being the sleeper success that Midnight Occult Civil Servants was." Rebecca Silverman felt it didn't explore more with its genre and into its main character Seiji but said that: "I think this has potential in the supernatural cop genre, and if it doesn't take too long to reveal more about the story's world, I think it could be worthwhile." The third reviewer, Nick Creamer, praised the show for having "strong narrative fundamentals" during its introduction and the direction for going through "coherent dramatic setpieces" with "snappy pacing" and "clear narrative stakes", concluding that: "All in all, Special 7 counts as a very strong entry in a fairly crowded genre. Seiji and Shiori are pretty classic rookie and veteran archetypes, but this episode was able to sell their individuality through its convincing dialogue, and kept its tension high from start to finish. If you're looking for a police drama this season, Special 7 seems like an excellent choice."

References

External links
Anime official website 

2019 anime television series debuts
Anime with original screenplays
Law enforcement in fiction
Terrorism in television
Funimation